Carnelian (also spelled cornelian) is a brownish-red mineral commonly used as a semi-precious gemstone. Similar to carnelian is sard, which is generally harder and darker (the difference is not rigidly defined, and the two names are often used interchangeably). Both carnelian and sard are varieties of the silica mineral chalcedony colored by impurities of iron oxide. The color can vary greatly, ranging from pale orange to an intense almost-black coloration. Significant localities include Yanacodo (Peru); Ratnapura (Sri Lanka); and Thailand. It has been found in Indonesia, Brazil, India, Russia (Siberia), and Germany.

History

The red variety of chalcedony has been known to be used as beads since the Early Neolithic in Bulgaria. The first faceted (with constant 16+16=32 facets on each side of the bead) carnelian beads are described from the Varna Chalcolithic necropolis (middle of the 5th millennium BC). The bow drill was used to drill holes into carnelian in Mehrgarh in the 4th-5th millennium BC.
Carnelian was recovered from Bronze Age Minoan layers at Knossos on Crete in a form that demonstrated its use in decorative arts; this use dates to approximately 1800 BC. Carnelian was used widely during Roman times to make engraved gems for signet or seal rings for imprinting a seal with wax on correspondence or other important documents. Hot wax does not stick to carnelian. Sard was used for Assyrian cylinder seals, Egyptian and Phoenician scarabs, and early Greek and Etruscan gems. The Hebrew odem (also translated as sardius), the first stone in the High Priest's breastplate, was a red stone, probably sard but perhaps red jasper. In Revelation 4:3, the One seated on the heavenly throne seen in the vision of John the apostle is said to "look like jasper and 'σαρδίῳ' (sardius transliterated)." And likewise it is in Revelation 21:20 as one of the precious stones in the foundations of the wall of the heavenly city.

There is a Neo-Assyrian seal made of carnelian in the Western Asiatic Seals collection of the British Museum that shows Ishtar-Gula as a star goddess. She is holding a ring of royal authority and is seated on a throne. She is shown with the spade of Marduk (his symbol), Sibbiti (seven) gods, the stylus of Nabu and a worshiper. An 8th century BC carnelian seal from the collection of the Ashmolean Museum shows Ishtar-Gula with her dog facing the spade of Marduk and his red dragon.

Etymology
Although now the more common term, "carnelian" is a 16th-century corruption of the 14th-century word "cornelian" (and its associated orthographies corneline and cornalyn). Cornelian, cognate with similar words in several Romance languages, comes from the Mediaeval Latin corneolus, itself derived from the Latin word cornum, the cornel cherry, whose translucent red fruits resemble the stone. The Oxford English Dictionary calls "carnelian" a perversion of "cornelian," by subsequent analogy with the Latin word caro, carnis, flesh. According to Pliny the Elder, sard derived its name from the city of Sardis in Lydia from which it came, and according to others, may ultimately be related to the Persian word سرد sered, meaning yellowish red.  Sarx in Greek means "flesh", and other stones have similar naming, such as the onyx stone in sardonyx, which came from Greek for "claw" or "fingernail" because onyx with flesh-colored and white bands can resemble a fingernail. So this type of use analogy may have been more widespread.

Distinction between carnelian and sard

The names carnelian and sard are often used interchangeably, but they can also be used to describe distinct subvarieties. The general differences are as follows:

All of these properties vary across a continuum, so the boundary between carnelian and sard is inherently blurry.

See also
 Carnelian (color)
 List of minerals

References

Further reading
 Allchin, B. 1979. "The agate and carnelian industry of Western India and Pakistan". – In: South Asian Archaeology 1975. E. J. Brill, Leiden, 91–105.
 Beck, H. C. 1933. "Etched carnelian beads". – The Antiquaries Journal, 13, 4, 384–398.
 Bellina, B. 2003. "Beads, social change and interaction between India and South-east Asia". – Antiquity, 77, 296, 285–297. 
 Brunet, O. 2009. "Bronze and Iron Age carnelian bead production in the UAE and Armenia: new perspectives". – Proceedings of the Seminar for Arabian Studies, 39, 57–68.  
 Carter, A. K., L. Dussubieux. 2016. "Geologic provenience analysis of agate and carnelian beads using laser ablation-inductively coupled plasma-mass spectrometry (LA-ICP-MS): A case study from Iron Age Cambodia and Thailand". – J. Archeol. Sci.: Reports, 6, 321–331.
 Cornaline de l'Inde. Des pratiques techniques de Cambay aux techno-systèmes de l'Indus (Ed. J.-C. Roux). 2000. Éditions de la Maison des sciences de l'homme, Paris, 558 pp.
 Glover, I. 2001. "Cornaline de l'Inde. Des pratiques techniques de Cambay aux techno-systèmes de l'Indus (sous la direction de V. Roux). – Bulletin de l'École française d'Extrême-Orient, 88, 376–381.
 Inizan, M.-L. 1999. "La cornaline de l’Indus à la Mésopotamie, production et circulation: la voie du Golfe au IIIe millénaire". – In: Cornaline et pierres précieuses. De Sumer à l'Islam (Ed. by F. Tallon), Musée du Louvre, Paris, 127–140.
 Insoll, T., D. A. Polya, K. Bhan, D. Irving, K. Jarvis. 2004. "Towards an understanding of the carnelian bead trade from Western India to sub-Saharan Africa: the application of UV-LA-ICP-MS to carnelian from Gujarat, India, and West Africa". – J. Archaeol. Sci., 31, 8, 1161–1173. 
 
 Mackay, E. 1933. "Decorated carnelian beads". – Man, 33, Sept., 143–146.
 Theunissen, R. 2007. "The agate and carnelian ornaments". – In: The Excavations of Noen U-Loke and Non Muang Kao (Eds. C. Higham, A. Kijngam, S. Talbot). The Thai Fine Arts Department, Bangkok, 359–377.

External links

Chalcedony
Trigonal minerals
Quartz gemstones